The Chosen Few Motorcycle Club are the first mixed race outlaw motorcycle club. Their first white member joined in 1960.

Other clubs
The same name is used by dozens of other unrelated motorcycle clubs in Iowa, New York, Texas, and other areas. The Chosen Few MC is based in the South Central California area with additional chapters nationwide and in the Philippines.

References 

Outlaw motorcycle clubs
1959 establishments in California
Organizations established in 1959
Motorcycle clubs in the United States